Fuck You is a form of the profanity "fuck". It may also refer to:

Music 
 Fuck You (EP), a 1987 thrash metal EP by Overkill
 "Fuck You" (CeeLo Green song), 2010
 "Fuck You" (Lily Allen song), 2009
 "Fuck You", a 1999 song by Dr. Dre on 2001
 "Fuck You", a 2004 metal song by Damageplan on New Found Power
 "Fuck You", a 2006 R&B single by Anna David
 "Fuck You", a 2011 comedy-folk song by Garfunkel and Oates
 "Fuck You", a 2012 punk rock single by Bad Religion
 "Fuck You", a 2013 pop single by Maria Mena
 "Fuck You", a 2021 song by Greekazo from the album 6ton5
 "Fuck You", a song by the Subhumans
 "Fuck You (An Ode to No One)", a 1995 song by Smashing Pumpkins from Mellon Collie and the Infinite Sadness
 "Hate You" (2NE1 song), originally titled "Fuck You"
 "Killing in the Name", a 1992 Rage Against the Machine song, whose lyrics contain more than a dozen "fuck you"s

Other uses 
 Fuck You (magazine), a literary periodical
 The finger, a gesture associated with the phrase
 Tokay gecko, also called a fuck-you lizard

See also 
 Fuck It (disambiguation)
 Fuck off (disambiguation)
 Fu (disambiguation)